Ironside is a surname. Notable people with the surname include:

Adelaide Ironside (1831–1867), Australian artist
Björn Ironside, Swedish King
Christopher Ironside, British artist and designer
David Ironside, South African cricketer
Edmund Ironside, King of England during 1016
Edmund Ironside, 1st Baron Ironside, British general
Edmund Ironside, 2nd Baron Ironside, British politician and engineer, son of the above
Edward Ironside (Lord Mayor of London) (1705–1753), Lord Mayor of London
Gilbert Ironside the elder (1588–1671), Bishop of Bristol
Gilbert Ironside the younger (1632–1701)
Harry A. Ironside, Bible teacher, preacher, and pastor
Hugo Ironside (1918–2008), British Army Officer
Ian Ironside (Born 1964), English Footballer
Isaac Ironside (1808–1870), British Chartist
Janey Ironside (1919–1979), Professor of fashion
Joe Ironside (Born 1993), English Footballer
Michael Ironside, Canadian character actor
Ralph Ironside, Archdeacon of Dorset
Robert Ironside (footballer), New Zealand international footballer
Robert Ironside (businessman), Canadian businessman
Roy Ironside (Born 1935), English Footballer
Samuel Ironside (1814–1897), New Zealand missionary
Virginia Ironside, British journalist

See also
Christopher Evans-Ironside, English/German composer and musician
Henry Bax-Ironside (1859–1929), British diplomat
Edmund Ironside (disambiguation)
Robert Ironside (disambiguation)